Abraha Kassa Nemariam (also known as Abraha Kassa and Wedi Kassa; born 15 July 1953) is an Eritrean Brigadier General. , he is the Director of the National Security Office of Eritrea, a post that he has held since 1997 or earlier.

U.S. sanctions 
On 12 November 2021, the U.S. Department of the Treasury added Kassa to its Specially Designated Nationals (SDN) list. Individuals on the list have their assets blocked and U.S. persons are generally prohibited from dealing with them.

References 

Bodyguards
Eritrean soldiers
Eritrean politicians
Eritrean spies
Living people
Year of birth missing (living people)
Specially Designated Nationals and Blocked Persons List